Elongated labia (also known as sinus pudoris or macronympha, and colloquially as khoikhoi apron or hottentot apron) is a feature of certain Khoikhoi and other African women who develop, whether naturally or through artificial stretching, relatively elongated labia minora, which may hang up to four inches outside the vulva when they are standing in an upright position.

History 
The "apron" designation was apparently gained from the tendency of early European descriptions to misidentify the pair of labia as a single, wide organ, which they called, in French, a tablier, or "apron".

The characteristics of this trait were known as early as the 1680s, the first European note on the subject being made by Anderson and Iverson, who visited the Cape of Good Hope in 1644, in relation to the "Hottentots" of that region, but became extensively documented in the late 18th and 19th century. The case of Sarah Baartman was significant. For many years, the identification of Baartman was questioned because she demonstrated this feature. Historically, elongated labia minora were said to be portrayed by a "Negro." So it is because of this trait that Baartman was considered to be part of the so-called "inferior race".

When Captain James Cook reached Cape Town in 1771, towards the end of his first voyage, he acknowledged being "very desirous to determine the great question among natural historians, whether the women of this country have or have not that fleshy flap or apron which has been called the sinus pudoris"; eventually a physician described treating patients with labia ranging from half an inch to three or four inches long.

In Eastern Africa Monica Wilson recorded the custom through her fieldwork with the Nyakyusa people in the 1930s, and in Southern Africa Isaac Schapera worked with the Nama people, the largest group amongst the Khoikhoi, also discussed labia stretching in The Khoisan Peoples of South Africa (1930). According to Schapera, some females were observed to exhibit elongated labia minora which sometimes projected as much as 10 cm below the vulva when standing. There was debate among these early anthropologists as to whether and in what circumstances such instances of elongated labia should be considered a physiological feature or the result of artificial manipulation.

Cultural practices 
Labia may be shaped by intentional labia stretching, a familial practice usually performed by an older aunt on girls beginning at the age of five. This practice formerly fell into the category of Type IV female genital mutilation, but in 2008 the World Health Organization reclassified the practice as a body modification procedure due to a perceived lack of harm and a reported positive perception of women's sexuality by those who practice it.

See also
Labia stretching
Saartjie "Sarah" Baartman
Steatopygia

References

Mammal female reproductive system
Gynaecology
Pelvis